Kim In-seo (born 11 January 1984) is a South Korean actress, best known for her portrayal of Se-jung in the 2010 action thriller film I Saw the Devil.

Works

She is best known for her portrayal of Se-jung in the action film I Saw the Devil, the film which was censored thrice to get an adult rating in South Korea. In the international cut of the film, her sex scene with Choi Min-sik, which exposed her naked butt was cut, while at the same time being retained in the Korean cut.

She has also appeared in another Korean films like Children, Goodbye Mom and drama series like Flower Band, Vampire Prosecutor, Please Come Back, Soon-ae and The Musical.

References

External links

Living people
South Korean film actresses
South Korean television actresses
1984 births